Shrimpton is a surname. Notable people with the surname include:

 Chrissie Shrimpton (born 1945), British model and actress; Jean Shrimpton's younger sister
 Herbert Shrimpton (1903–1979), English cricketer
 Jean Shrimpton (born 1942), British supermodel and actress; Chrissie Shrimpton's older sister
 Major-General John Shrimpton, British Army general, Governor of Gibraltar 1704–1707; Member of Parliament for Whitchurch
 Mark Shrimpton, known as Distant Soundz, British dance artist
 Michael Shrimpton, British barrister
 Mike Shrimpton (born 1940), New Zealand cricketer
 Richard Shrimpton (1910–1979), British boxer